"Houston, we have a problem" is a popular but slightly erroneous quotation from the radio communications between the Apollo 13 astronauts Jack Swigert, Jim Lovell and the NASA Mission Control Center ("Houston") during the Apollo 13 spaceflight in 1970, as the astronauts communicated their discovery of the explosion that crippled their spacecraft to mission control.

The words actually spoken, initially by Swigert, were "Okay, Houston, we've had a problem here". After being prompted to repeat the transmission by CAPCOM Jack R. Lousma, this time Lovell responded with "Uh, Houston, we've had a problem."

Since then, the phrase "Houston, we have a problem" has become popular, being used to account, informally, the emergence of an unforeseen problem, often with a sense of ironic understatement.

The message 
The Apollo 13 Flight Journal lists the timestamps and dialogue between the astronauts and Mission Control. Along with the original audio, the message was:

55:55:19 Swigert: Okay, Houston...

55:55:19 Lovell: [Garbled]

55:55:20 Swigert: ...we've had a problem here.

55:55:28 Lousma: This is Houston. Say again, please.

55:55:35 Lovell: Uh, Houston, we've had a problem. We've had a Main B Bus Undervolt.

In Chapter 13 of Apollo Expeditions to the Moon (1975), Jim Lovell recalls the event: "Jack Swigert saw a warning light that accompanied the bang, and said, 'Houston, we've had a problem here.' I came on and told the ground that it was a main B bus undervolt. The time was 21:08 hours on April 13."

In media
In the 1995 film Apollo 13, the actual quote was shortened to "Houston, we have a problem". Screenwriter William Broyles Jr. made the change, stating that the verb tense actually used "wasn't as dramatic". Broyles and American University linguist Naomi S. Baron said the actual line spoken would not work well in a suspense movie. Movie viewers knew what had happened, while Mission Control did not at the time. The quote ranked at No. 50 on AFI's 100 Greatest Movie Quotes in June 2005.

References

Bibliography

External links

1970 neologisms
Apollo 13
English phrases
Jack Swigert
Jim Lovell
Quotations from science
Misquotations
1995 neologisms
Quotations from film